Pantel may refer to:

 Panamericana Televisión, a Peruvian television network
 Guylène Pantel (born 1963), French politician
 Sylvia Pantel (born 1961), German politician
 Thierry Pantel (born 1964), French former long-distance runner